The Tampines Group Representation Constituency is a five-member Group Representation Constituency (GRC) in the eastern region of Singapore. The GRC encompasses Tampines with five divisions: Tampines East, Tampines West, Tampines Central, Tampines North and Tampines Changkat. The current MPs are from the People's Action Party (PAP) Masagos Zulkifli, Baey Yam Keng, Desmond Choo, Cheng Li Hui and Koh Poh Koon.

Town Council

Tampines Town Council is operating under Tampines GRC.

Members of Parliament

Electoral results

Elections in 2020s

Elections in 2010s

Elections in 2000s

Elections in 1990s

Elections in 1980s

References
2020 General Election's result
2015 General Election's result
2011 General Election's result
2006 General Election's result
2001 General Election's result
1997 General Election's result
1991 General Election's result
1988 General Election's result

Singaporean electoral divisions
Tampines